Rupert II, Count Palatine of the Rhine (12 May 1325, Amberg – 6 January 1398, Amberg). He was the Elector Palatine of the Rhine from the house of Wittelsbach in 1390–1398.

Life
Rupert was the elder son of Adolf, Count Palatine of the Rhine and Countess Irmengard of Oettingen. On 13 February 1338 the Palatinate was divided between Rupert II and his uncle Rudolf II, Duke of Bavaria.  After the death of his other uncle, the Elector Rupert I (who had succeeded Rudolf II), on 16 February 1390 he was proclaimed Elector Palatine with the consent of Wenceslaus, King of the Romans. In 1391 he banished Jews and prostitutes from the Palatinate, confiscated their property, and bequeathed it to the Ruprecht Karl University of Heidelberg. In 1395 he promulgated the so-called Rupertinische Konstitution which was intended to provide for unity of the Palatinate.  Among other provisions, he incorporated to his realm the former Imperial Free City Neckargemünd.

He was buried in Schönau Abbey a Cistercian monastery in Heidelberg.

Family and children
Rupert was married in 1345 to Beatrice, daughter of King Peter II of Sicily. They had:
 Anna (1346 – 30 November 1415), married in 1363 to William VII of Jülich, 1st Duke of Berg.
 Friedrich (1347 – c. 1395).
 Johann (1349 – c. 1395).
 Mechthild (born 1350),  married to Landgrave Sigost of Leuchtenberg.
 Elisabeth (c. 1351 – 1360).
 King Rupert of Germany (1352 – 1410), married Elisabeth of Nuremberg
 Adolf (1355 – 1 May 1358).

References

Sources

Wittelsbach, Rupert II, Elector Palatine
Wittelsbach, Rupert II, Elector Palatine
House of Wittelsbach
Burials at Schönau Abbey
Counts Palatine of Zweibrücken
Prince-electors of the Palatinate